Tomasz "Tomek" Adamek (born 1 December 1976) is a Polish former professional boxer who competed from 1999 to 2018. He held world championships in two weight classes, including the WBC light heavyweight title from 2005 to 2007, and the IBF and Ring magazine cruiserweight titles from 2008 to 2009. He also held the IBO cruiserweight title in 2007, and challenged once for the WBC heavyweight title in 2011. BoxRec ranks Adamek as the second best Polish boxer of all time, pound for pound. He is the first Polish boxer to win The Ring title.

Early life
Adamek was born in Żywiec, Poland, as of 2012 he resided in Kearny, New Jersey.

Professional career

Adamek made his professional boxing debut on 13 March 1999 in Manchester, England against Israel Khumalo. He won by TKO in the first round.

Light-heavyweight

WBC light-heavyweight champion
Adamek won the vacant WBC light-heavyweight title defeating Paul "Firepower" Briggs by majority decision on 21 May 2005. The fight was described by some as one of the most brutal in recent memory, as Briggs suffered a large cut above his left eye early in the fight and Adamek bled profusely from his nose for much of the fight as well. Adamek tended to be the aggressor and won the fight. 
  
On 15 October 2005, he defended his title against German boxer Thomas Ulrich by knockout in Round 6.

He then defended his title in a rematch with Paul Briggs in 2006, again winning by majority decision.
After the fight Jim Lampley said that Adamek vs Briggs I and II was the best combined 24 rounds he has ever seen.

Adamek vs. Dawson
Undefeated Adamek with 31-0 (21 KO) lost his first fight by unanimous decision to Chad Dawson on 3 February 2007. During that fight, Adamek was knocked down in the seventh round; this was only the second time in his career he has been knocked down (upon slow-motion replay, Adamek was shown to have tripped on Dawson's foot after the body shot). Adamek, well behind on points, provided some drama by suddenly dropping Dawson in the 10th round but Dawson fended off the onslaught that followed, and won a clear-cut points decision. Immediately following the loss to Dawson, Adamek decided to move up in the cruiserweight division.

Cruiserweight
After losing to Dawson, Adamek moved up to cruiserweight to beat Luis Andres Pineda by technical knockout in round seven. He defeated Josip Jalusic on 29 December 2007 in Germany.

Adamek vs. Bell
On 19 April 2008, in Poland, Adamek fought former undisputed cruiserweight champion O'Neil Bell in an IBF Cruiserweight title eliminator. Adamek floored Bell in round one and had good success by outboxing Bell. Bell opted not to come out for round eight, citing that he felt dizzy and ill.

IBF and lineal cruiserweight champion
In December 2008 he fought the then reigning champion Steve Cunningham at the Prudential Center in Newark, New Jersey. Knocking a game Cunningham down three times, he won the IBF and vacant lineal cruiserweight titles in a bout many thought was the fight of the year.
  
Adamek successfully defended his title against Johnathon Banks on 27 February 2009, at the Prudential Center in Newark. He won with a brutal TKO in the 8th Round. He then went on to defeat Bobby Gunn before a large crowd at the Prudential Center on 11 July 2009, with the referee stopping the bout at the ring physician's advice between rounds four and five.

He vacated the IBF title on 18 October 2009, choosing to move up to the heavyweight division.

Heavyweight
On 24 October 2009 in Łódź, Poland, Adamek defeated Andrew Golota by TKO in the fifth round to win the IBF "International" Heavyweight Title. Then, on 6 February 2010 in Newark's Prudential Center he defeated Jason Estrada by unanimous decision after 12 rounds.

Adamek (40-1; 27 KO) then took on fellow heavyweight contender Chris Arreola (28-1; 25 KO) on 24 April 2010, at the Citizens Business Bank Arena in Ontario, California. The bout was televised as part of Boxing After Dark. The Polish fighter won a twelve-round majority decision, with the scores of 114–114, 115–113, and 117–111. A day before the bout, Arreola weighed 250½ pounds, while Adamek was 217.

In 2010 he was the first Polish winner of the "Muhammad Ali Athlete Award" at the Giant Awards diner in Chicago.

Adamek defeated veteran American Michael Grant by unanimous decision on 21 August 2010. In his first fight of 2011, Adamek defeated Irishman Kevin McBride by a wide unanimous decision.

Adamek vs. Vitali Klitschko

On 10 September 2011 Adamek faced the WBC heavyweight champion Vitali Klitschko in Poland, losing by TKO in the 10th round, in the first ever PPV fight in Polish TV history. The referee stopped the bout after Adamek received punishing blows and was ruled out, as he was no longer able to defend himself.

Post-Klitschko fights

Adamek returned on 24 March 2012, after signing a contract with Main Events, defeating Nagy Aguilera by unanimous decision. He then agreed to face former heavyweight contender Eddie Chambers. Both Adamek and Chambers were praised for taking the fight with no world title nor mandatory position on the line. Coming into the fight, Adamek was ranked No.3 heavyweight contender by The Ring, while Chambers, having had only one fight in two years and three months, was unranked by the publication. The fight was the main event of the Fight Night card on NBC Sports. In the opening rounds, both fighters were trading shots, with Chambers landing the most meaningful punches. During the first round, Chambers torn his bicep in the left arm, and often switched between orthodox and southpaw stances throughout the rest of the fight, throwing shots almost exclusively with the right hand, mostly connecting with overhand punches. Adamek was more active since round 3, frequently switching up from counterpuncher to aggressor. The bout lasted full twelve rounds, with Adamek being declared the winner by unanimous decision with scores 116–112 (twice) and 119–109. According to CompuBox, 1,381 punches were thrown, with Chambers landing 152 punches out of 462 thrown (32.9% accuracy), while Adamek landed 134 punches out of 919 (14.6%).

Adamek defeated Travis Walker on 8 September 2012 via fifth-round technical knockout at 1:51 due to a stoppage by the referee.

Adamek defeated Steve Cunningham in a very close and somewhat controversial split decision on 22 December 2012. Initially, the result was a draw, but after noticing a mathematical miscalculation in the judges scorecards, Adamek was declared the winner. On 15 March 2014 Adamek was defeated by Vyacheslav Glazkov by unanimous decision after 12 rounds, losing his IBF North American heavyweight title.

Adamek vs Haumono 
On June 24, 2017, Adamek defeated Solomon Haumono via unanimous decision, 100-90, 99-91 and 99-91 on the scorecards.

Adamek vs. Kassi 
On November 18, 2017, Adamek fought and defeated Fred Kassi via unanimous decision, 97-93, 96-94 and 96-94 on the scorecards.

Adamek vs. Miller 
On October 6, 2018, Adamek fought heavyweight contender Jarell Miller. Miller was ranked #2 by the WBA and #5 by the WBO at the time. Miller dropped Adamek twice in the second round. After the second knockdown the referee stopped the fight despite a disoriented Adamek making it to his feet.

Professional boxing record

Television viewership

United States

Pay-per-view bouts

See also
List of light heavyweight boxing champions
List of cruiserweight boxing champions
List of WBC world champions
List of IBF world champions
List of The Ring world champions

References

External links

Interview with Tomasz Adamek at BoxingInsider
Tomasz Adamek profile at Cyber Boxing Zone
Tomasz Adamek - Profile, News Archive & Current Rankings at Box.Live

1976 births
Living people
Boxers from New Jersey
World Boxing Council champions
International Boxing Federation champions
Polish Gorals
People from Kearny, New Jersey
People from Żywiec
Sportspeople from Hudson County, New Jersey
Sportspeople from Silesian Voivodeship
Polish male boxers
The Ring (magazine) champions
International Boxing Organization champions
Heavyweight boxers
World light-heavyweight boxing champions
World cruiserweight boxing champions
Polish emigrants to the United States